Abdou Nef (2 April 1995 – 5 November 2013) was an Algerian footballer, who primarily played as a midfielder.

Death
Abdou Nef died of injuries sustained in a traffic collision on 5 November 2013, aged 18, in his hometown of Meftah, Blida Province.

References

1995 births
2013 deaths
Road incident deaths in Algeria
Algerian footballers
Association football midfielders
21st-century Algerian people